A subregion or sub-region is a designation for an administrative division in some countries.

List of sets
 Colombia: Antioquia Department - 9 subregions.
 Eritrea: Subregions of Eritrea
 Finland: Subregions of Finland
 Hungary: Subregions of Hungary LAU 1 ~ NUTS 4 (173 [statisztikai] kistérségek)
 Poland: NUTS:PL Level 3, 66 Podregiony
 Portugal: NUTS:PT Level 3, 30 subregiões
 Turkey: Subregions of Turkey (21 bölüm)
 Uganda: :Category:Sub-regions of Uganda

Types of administrative division